List of Guggenheim Fellowships awarded in 1975.

1975 U.S. and Canadian Fellows

 Edward Ostrander Abbey, deceased. Fiction.
 Claus Adam, deceased. Music Composition.
 Ai, poet; Professor of English, Oklahoma State University. Appointed as Ogawa, Pelorhankhe Ai L'heah.
 Richard D. Altick, Regents' Professor Emeritus of English, The Ohio State University.
 Takeshi Amemiya, Professor of Economics, Stanford University.
 Guy Irving Anderson, deceased. Fine Arts.
 Richard Lewis Arnowitt, Professor of Physics, Northeastern University.
 Joseph H. Aronson, architectural designer and graphic artist, Highmont, New York.
 Robert Jeffrey Art, Christian A. Herter Professor of Internal Relations, Brandeis University.
 Nina Baym, Jubilee Professor of English, Liberal Arts and Sciences, University of Illinois at Urbana-Champaign.
 Jeffery Francis Beardsall, artist.
 Wayne Marvin Becker, Professor of Botany, University of Wisconsin–Madison.
 Wayne E. Begley, Professor of Indian and Islamic Art History, University of Iowa.
 Marvin Hartley Bell, poet; Flannery O'Connor Professor of Letters, University of Iowa.
 Nuel D. Belnap, Professor of Philosophy Sociology, and History and Philosophy of Science, University of Pittsburgh.
 Dan Ben-Amos, Professor of Folklore & Folklife, University of Pennsylvania.
 Reinhard Bendix, deceased. Political Science.
 Lynda Benglis, artist, New York City.
 Billy Al Bengston, artist, Venice, California.
 Stephen James Benkovic, Evan Pugh Professor of Chemistry, Pennsylvania State University.
 Arthur Victor Berger, composer; Irving G. Fine Professor Emeritus of Music, Brandeis University; Member of the Faculty, New England Conservatory.
 Toby Berger, Irwin and Joan Jacob Professor of Engineering, Cornell University.
 Natvar Bhavsar, artist, New York City.
 Sheila Biddle, historian, New York City.
 Allan David Bloom, deceased. Political Science.
 Carol K. Blum, Research Professor of Humanities, State University of New York at Stony Brook.
 George Herbert Borts, George S. and Nancy B. Parker Professor of Economics, Brown University.
 Stanley Boxer, artist, Ancramdale, New York.
 Kathleen Weil-Garris Brandt, Professor of Fine Arts, New York University. Appointed as Weil-Garris, Kathleen. Applied as Posner, Kathleen Weil-Garris.
 David A. Brant, Professor of Chemistry, University of California, Irvine.
 Timothy Hall Breen, William Smith Mason Professor of American History, Northwestern University.
 Joan Wanda Bresnan, Professor of Linguistics, Stanford University.
 David Ross Brillinger, Professor of Statistics, University of California, Berkeley: 1975, 1982.
 Malcolm J. Brown, Professor of English, University of Washington.
 Trisha Brown, choreographer; artistic director, Trisha Brown Dance Company, New York City: 1975, 1984.
 Virginia Brown, senior fellow, Pontifical Institute of Mediaeval Studies, Toronto.
 Don Spencer Browning, Alexander Campbell Professor of Ethics and the Social Sciences, University of Chicago Divinity School.
 John D. Buenker, Professor of History and Ethnic Studies, University of Wisconsin–Parkside.
 Richard Williams Bulliet, Professor of History, Columbia University.
 Fritz Bultman, deceased. Fine Arts.
 Matei Alexe Calinescu, Professor of Comparative Literature and West European Studies, Indiana University.
 Peter Campus, artist, New York City.
 Marjorie C. Caserio, Vice Chancellor for Academic Affairs, University of California, San Diego.
 Jonathan David Casper, Professor of Political Science, Northwestern University.
 Kai Lai Chung, Professor Emeritus of Mathematics, Stanford University.
 Aaron V. Cicourel, Professor of Cognitive Science, Pediatrics and Sociology, University of California, San Diego.
 Herbert Horace Clark, Professor of Psychology, Stanford University.
 Martha Clarke, choreographer and theatre artist, Sherman, Connecticut: 1975, 1988.
 John Louis Edwin Clubbe, Emeritus Professor of English, University of Kentucky.
 Harold Clurman, deceased. Theatre Arts: 1975, 1979.
 Bruce Cole, Distinguished Professor of Fine Arts, Indiana University.
 Jonathan R. Cole, Provost, Columbia University.
 Paul J. Coleman, Jr., Professor of Space Physics; Director, Institute of Geophysics and Planetary Physics, University of California, Los Angeles.
 William Arthur Coles, Professor of Electrical Engineering, UCSD.
 Richard J. Colwell, Professor of Music, University of Michigan.
 Bruce Guldner Conner, artist, San Francisco, California.
 Philip E. Converse, retired president, director, Center for Advanced Study in the Behavioral Sciences, Stanford, California.
 Henry S. F. Cooper Jr. Writer, New York City.
 James W. Corbett, deceased. Physics.
 Lewis A. Coser, Distinguished Professor Emeritus of Sociology, State University of New York at Stony Brook.
 Milton Curtis Cummings Jr., Professor of Political Science, Johns Hopkins University.
 Leopold Damrosch Jr., Ernest Bernbaum Professor of English and American Literature, Harvard University.
 John H. D'Arms, President, American Council of Learned Societies.
 Paul A. David, Professor of Economics and William Robertson Coe Professor of American Economic History, Stanford University.
 L. J. Davis, writer, Brooklyn, New York.
 Douglas Turner Day, III, deceased. Commonwealth Professor of English, University of Virginia.
 Paul Delany, Professor of English, Simon Fraser University.
 Bryce Seligman DeWitt, Jane and Roland Blumberg Professor of Physics, University of Texas at Austin.
 Paul Diamond, photographer, Brooklyn, New York.
 John Patrick Diggins, Distinguished Professor of History, The Graduate School, CUNY.
 Norman Thomas di Giovanni, writer and translator, England.
 William Franklin Dove, George Streisinger Professor of Experimental Biology, University of Wisconsin–Madison.
 José C. Durand, deceased. Professor of Spanish and Portuguese, University of California, Berkeley.
 James Louis Dye, University Distinguished Professor Emeritus of Chemistry, Michigan State University: 1975, 1990.
 Mel Eugene Edwards, artist; Professor of Visual Art, Livingston College, Rutgers University.
 Milton Ehre, Professor of Russian Literature, University of Chicago.
 Ernest L. Eliel, William Rand Kenan, Jr., Professor Emeritus of Chemistry, University of North Carolina at Chapel Hill: 1975, 1983.
 Edward Earle Ellis, deceased, Research Professor Emeritus of Theology, Southwestern Baptist Theological Seminary, Fort Worth, Texas.
 Ruth Snodgrass El Saffar, deceased. Spanish & Portuguese Literature.
 Robert Porter Erickson, Douglas S. Holsclaw Professor of Human Genetics & Metabolic Diseases, University of Arizona.
 Wallace Gary Ernst, Professor of Geological and Environmental Sciences, Stanford University.
 Norma Evenson, Professor Emeritus of Architectural History, University of California, Berkeley.
 Peter Paul Everwine, poet; Professor of English, California State University, Fresno.
 Ronald Lyman Fair, writer, Vantaa, Finland.
 Donald Fanger, deceased. Slavic Literature.
 Herbert Federer, Florence Pierce Grant University Professor Emeritus of Mathematics, Brown University.
 Jackie Ferrara, artist, New York City.
 Robert Kaul Finn, Professor of Chemical Engineering, Cornell University.
 Stanley Martin Flatté, Professor of Physics, University of California, Santa Cruz.
 Eric Foner, DeWitt Clinton Professor of History, Columbia University.
 Richard Foreman, playwright; Artistic Director, Ontological-Hysteric Theater, New York City.
 Kenneth Brian Frampton, Ware Professor of Architecture, Columbia University.
 Bernard Joel Frieden, Associate Dean, Ford Professor of Urban Development, Massachusetts Institute of Technology.
 John Friedmann, Professor Emeritus of Planning, University of California, Los Angeles.
 Rose Epstein Frisch, Associate Professor Emerita of Population Sciences, Harvard University School of Public Health
 William Cecil Gardiner Jr., Professor of Chemistry and Biochemistry, University of Texas at Austin.
 Sidney Geist, artist; Lecturer in Art, Vassar College; Instructor in Sculpture, New York Studio School.
 Dante L. Germino, Professor of Government and Foreign Affairs, University of Virginia.
 Alan Gewirth, Edward Carson Waller Distinguished Service Professor of Philosophy, University of Chicago.
 Laura Gilpin, deceased. Photography.
 Mirra Ginsburg, translator, editor, and anthologist, New York City.
 Robert Glaser, University Professor of Psychology and Education and Director Emeritus, Learning Research and Development Center, University of Pittsburgh.
 Louise Glück, poet, Cambridge, Massachusetts; Preston S. Parish '41 Third Century Lecturer in English, Williams College: 1975, 1987.
 Gail K. Godwin, writer, Woodstock, New York.
 Frank William Gohlke, photographer, Southborough, Massachusetts: 1975, 1984.
 Alvin Ira Goldman, Regents' Professor of Philosophy, University of Arizona.
 Brian Erich Goode, Professor of Sociology, State University of New York at Stony Brook.
 Leslie David Gottlieb, Professor of Genetics, University of California, Davis.
 Peter Leonard Gourfain, artist, Brooklyn, New York.
 Ernest Grunwald, Emeritus Professor of Chemistry, Brandeis University.
 Charles Vernon Hamilton, Wallace S. Sayre Professor Emeritus of Government, Columbia University.
 Harriett Bloker Hawkins, deceased. Senior Research Fellow, Linacue College, Oxford.
 Robert F. Heinecken, photographer, Chicago, Illinois; Emeritus Professor of Art, University of California, Los Angeles.
 Josephine Gattuso Hendin, Professor of English, New York University.
 John B. Henneman Jr, deceased. History Bibliographer, Princeton University.
 Heinrich Dieter Holland, Harry C. Dudley Professor of Economic Geology, Harvard University.
 Anne Hollander, writer, New York City.
 David J. Hooson, Professor of Geography and Dean of Social Sciences, University of California, Berkeley.
 James Richard Houck, Kenneth A. Wallace Professor of Astronomy, Cornell University.
 Wu-Chung Hsiang, Professor of Mathematics, Princeton University.
 Ray Huang, scholar, New Paltz, New York.
 Michael Craig Hudson, Professor of International Relations and Government; Seif Ghobash Professor of Arab Studies, Georgetown University.
 Richard Norman Hunt, deceased. German & East European History.
 Albert F. Innaurato, playwright, New York City.
 Glynn Llywelyn Isaac, deceased. Anthropology.
 Ellen Hulda Elizabeth Johnson, deceased. Fine Arts Research.
 George McTurnan Kahin, A. L. Binenkorb Professor Emeritus of International Studies and Professor of Government, Cornell University.
 Emil Thomas Kaiser, deceased. Chemistry.
 Aristodimos Kaldis, deceased. Fine Arts: 1975, 1977.
 Rosabeth Moss Kanter, Class of 1960 Professor of Business Administration, Harvard University.
 Justin Kaplan, writer, Cambridge, Massachusetts.
 Walter Bernard Karp, deceased. General Nonfiction.
 Nicholas M. Katz, Professor of Mathematics, Princeton University: 1975, 1987.
 Peter Bain Kenen, Ph.D. Walker Professor of Economics and International Finance, Princeton University.
 David M. Kennedy, Donald J. McLachlan Professor of History, Stanford University.
 Edith Kern, Doris Silbert Professor Emeritus of Comparative Literature, Smith College.
 Lewis Martin Killian, Professor Emeritus of Sociology, University of Massachusetts Amherst.
 Martin Luther Kilson, Frank G. Thomson Professor of Government, Harvard University.
 Abraham Klein, Emeritus Professor of Physics, University of Pennsylvania.
 Philip Kolb, deceased. French Literature.
 Aileen S. Kraditor, Professor Emeritus of History, Boston University.
 Masatake Kuranishi, Professor of Mathematics, Columbia University.
 Robin T. Lakoff, Professor of Linguistics, University of California, Berkeley.
 Gerd Neustadter La Mar, Director, Nuclear Magnetic Resonance Facility; Professor of Chemistry, University of California, Davis.
 Joseph P. LaSalle, deceased. Applied Science.
 Steven Lattimore, Associate Professor of Classics and Classical Archaeology, University of California, Los Angeles.
 Erastus Henry Lee, The Rosalind and John J. Redfern, Jr, Professor Emeritus of Mechanical Engineering and of Aeronautics and Astronautics, Stanford University; Redfern Professor of Mechanical Engineering, Rensselaer Polytechnic Institute.
 Peter H. Lee, Professor of Korean and Comparative Literature, University of California, Los Angeles.
 Arthur Allen Leff, Deceased. Law.
 Michael Lekakis, Deceased. Fine Arts.
 William E. Leuchtenburg, William Rand Kenan Professor of History, University of North Carolina at Chapel Hill.
 Brian Paul Levack, John Green Regents Professor of History, University of Texas at Austin.
 Donald A. Levin, Professor of Botany, University of Texas at Austin.
 Baruch Abraham Levine, Skirball Professor of Bible and Ancient Near Eastern Studies, New York University.
 Leon Levinstein, deceased. Photography.
 Donald Harris Levy, Professor of Chemistry, University of Chicago.
 Norman Wilfred Lewis, deceased. Fine Arts-Painting.
 Philip Magdalany, deceased. Drama.
 George Malko, screenwriter, New York City.
 Stephen A. Marglin, Walter S. Barker Professor of Economics, Harvard University.
 Arthur Francis Marotti, Professor of English, Wayne State University.
 Kenneth R. Maxwell, Senior Fellow for Inter-American Studies, and Director, Latin American Program, Council on Foreign Relations, New York City.
 Robert A. McCaughey, Professor of History, Vice President for Academic Affairs and Dean of the Faculty, Barnard College, Columbia University.
 Richard Alan McCray, George Gamow Distinguished Professor of Astrophysics, University of Colorado.
 Sally McLendon, Professor of Anthropology, Hunter College and Graduate Center, City University of New York.
 Donald A. McQuarrie, Retired Professor of Chemistry, University of California, Davis.
 Clement Lyon Meadmore, artist.
 William Meredith, poet; Henry B. Plant Professor Emeritus of English, Connecticut College.
 H. C. Erik Midelfort, Professor of History, University of Virginia.
 Jan Miel, Emeritus Professor of Letters and Romance Languages and Literatures, Wesleyan University.
 David H. Miles, Associate Professor of German and Member of the Center for Advanced Studies, University of Virginia.
 William Hughes Miller, Kenneth S. Pitzer Distinguished Professor of Chemistry, University of California, Berkeley.
 Frederick Milstein, Professor of Materials and Mechanical Engineering, University of California, Santa Barbara.
 Roger Edward Mitchell, Professor Emeritus of Sociology and Anthropology, University of Wisconsin–Eau Claire.
 Francis Peter Mouris, filmmaker, Nassau, New York.
 John Emery Murdoch, deceased. Professor of the History of Science, Harvard University.
 Bruce Churchill Murray, Professor of Planetary Science, California Institute of Technology.
 Bernard Quinn Nietschmann, deceased. Geography.
 Anthony Richard Oberschall, Professor of Sociology, University of North Carolina at Chapel Hill.
 Tillie Olsen, writer, Berkeley, California.
 John William O'Malley, Distinguished Professor of Church History, Weston School of Theology, Cambridge, Massachusetts.
 Alfonso Alex Ortiz, deceased. Anthropology.
 George Frederick Oster, Professor of Entomology, University of California, Berkeley.
 John Milan Palka, Professor of Zoology, University of Washington.
 Roy Harvey Pearce, Professor of American Literature, University of California, San Diego.
 John Richard Perry, Henry Waldgrave Stuart Professor of Philosophy, Stanford University.
 Tommy L. Phillips, Professor of Plant Biology and Geology, University of Illinois at Urbana-Champaign.
 Philip Alan Pincus, Professor of Engineering Materials and Physics, University of California, Santa Barbara.
 David Edwin Pingree, Professor of the History of Mathematics, Brown University.
 Michael P. Predmore, Professor of Spanish, Stanford University.
 David Rabinowitch, artist, New York City.
 Dabbala Rajagopal Reddy, Professor of Computer Science, Director of The Robotics Institute, Carnegie Mellon University.
 Ishmael Scott Reed, writer, Oakland, California; senior lecturer, University of California-Berkeley.
 Robert C. Richardson, F. R. Newman Professor of Physics, Cornell University: 1975, 1982.
 Joseph Neill Riddel, deceased. American Literature.
 Stephen Alan Ross, Franco Modigliani Professor of Economics and Finance, Yale University.
 Richard Hunter Rouse, Professor of History, University of California, Los Angeles.
 Margit Ruth Rowell, Curator of Special Projects, Centro de Arte Reina Sofía, Madrid, Spain.
 Lloyd Irving Rudolph, deceased. Professor of Political Science and the Social Sciences, University of Chicago.
 Robert D. Sack. Professor of Geography, University of Wisconsin–Madison.
 Jun John Sakurai, deceased. Physicist.
 Jack R. Salamanca, writer, Professor of English, University of Maryland.
 Nora Sayre, writer, New York City.
 Richard Schechner, Theatre Director; University Professor and Professor of Performance Studies, New York University.
 Robert Tod Schimke, American Cancer Society Research Professor of Biology, Stanford University.
 Thayer Scudder, Professor of Anthropology, California Institute of Technology.
 John Rogers Searle, Professor of Philosophy, University of California, Berkeley.
 Gino Claudio Segrè, Professor of Physics, University of Pennsylvania.
 Leon Eugene Seltzer, deceased. Law and Bibliography.
 Allen I. Selverston, Professor Emeritus of Biology, University of California, San Diego.
 Donna Shalala, U.S. Secretary of Health and Human Services.
 Susan Sheehan, writer, Washington, D.C.
 Richard M. Shiffrin, Luther Dana Waterman Professor of Psychology, Indiana University.
 Stephen Shore, photographer; Susan Weber Soros Professor in the Arts, Bard College.
 James F. Short Jr., Emeritus Professor of Sociology and Director, Social Research Center, Washington State University.
 Joseph Ivor Silk, Associate Professor of Astronomy, University of California, Berkeley.
 Bennett Simon, Clinical Professor of Psychiatry at the Cambridge Hospital, Harvard Medical School.
 Pril Smiley, composer; retired director, Columbia University Electronic Music Center, New York.
 Hamilton O. Smith, Professor of Molecular Biology & Genetics, Johns Hopkins University School of Medicine.
 Peter H. Smith, Professor of Political Science; Simon Bolivar Professor of Latin American Studies, University of California, San Diego.
 Paul Michael Sniderman, Professor of Political Science, Stanford University.
 Robert R. Sokal, Distinguished Professor of Ecology and Evolution, State University of New York at Stoney Brook: 1975, 1983.
 Otto Thomas Solbrig, Bussey Professor of Biology, Harvard University.
 Andrew Michael Spence, Dean, Graduate School of Business, Stanford University.
 Alan B. Spitzer, Professor Emeritus of History, University of Iowa.
 Franklin William Stahl, American Cancer Society Research Professor of Molecular Genetics, University of Oregon: 1975, 1985.
 Kurt Stone, Deceased. Music editor.
 Michelle Stuart, Artist, New York City.
 Morton Subotnick, composer; Member of the Faculty, School of Music, California Institute of the Arts.
 Muttaiya Sundaralingam, Professor, Ohio Eminent Scholar, Ohio State University.
 Dana F. Sutton, Professor of Classics, University of California, Irvine.
 Marc Jerome Swartz, Professor of Anthropology, University of California, San Diego.
 Robert Lee Switzer, Sid Richardson Foundation Regents Chair, Professor of Physics, University of Texas at Austin.
 Wilson Hon-Chung Tang, Professor and Associate Head of Civil Engineering, University of Illinois at Urbana-Champaign.
 Leonardo Tarán, Jay Professor of Greek and Latin Languages, Columbia University.
 Lewis G. Tilney, Robert Strausz-Hupé Term Professor of Biology, University of Pennsylvania.
 Marvin Torffield, artist, New York City.
 Stephen Edelston Toulmin, Henry R. Luce Professor of Philosophy, University of Southern California.
 Teddy Gene Traylor, deceased. Chemistry.
 William M. Tuttle Jr., Professor of History and American Studies, University of Kansas.
 Geerat J. Vermeij, Professor of Geology, University of California, Davis.
 Linda C. Wagner-Martin, Hanes Professor of English, University of North Carolina, Chapel Hill, NC. Appointed as Wagner, Linda C.
 Michael Walzer, Professor and Permanent Member, School of Social Science, Institute for Advanced Study, Princeton: 1975.
 Harold Wesley Watts, Emeritus Professor of Economics and Public Affairs, Columbia University: 1975.
 William George Wegman, Artist, New York City: 1975, 1987.
 Jeffrey George Weiss, playwright, New York City.
 William Wertenbaker, writer, Greens Farms, Connecticut.
 Norman Keith Wessells, Provost and Vice President for Academic Affairs, University of Oregon.
 Kern Wildenthal, President and Professor of Physiology and Internal Medicine, University of Texas Southwestern Medical School at Dallas.
 Lawrence Wilets, Emeritus Professor of Physics, University of Washington.
 Joy Williams, Writer, Tucson, Arizona.
 Kenneth L. Williamson, Mary E. Woolley Professor of Chemistry, Mount Holyoke College.
 Edward O. Wilson, Frank B. Baird, Jr., Professor of Science and Curator in Entomology, Harvard University.
 Fred Huffman Wilt, Professor of Cell and Developmental Biology, University of California, Berkeley.
 Andrew Wojcicki, Professor of Chemistry, Ohio State University: 1975.
 Eugene K. Wolf, Class of 1965 Term Professor (Emeritus) of Music, University of Pennsylvania: 1975.
 Peter H. Wood, Associate Professor of History, Duke University.
 William Barry Wood, Professor of Molecular, Cellular, and Developmental Biology, University of Colorado.
 Charles Penzel Wright Jr., poet, Souder Family Professor of English, University of Virginia.
 Robert Milton Young, filmmaker, Los Angeles, California.

1975 Latin American and Caribbean Fellows
 Carlos Eduardo Alchourrón, Deceased. Professor of Philosophy and Law, University of Buenos Aires, Argentina: 1975.
 Manuel Alvarez Bravo, photographer, Mexico City.
 Guillermo Araya-Goubet, deceased. Spanish Literature.
 Enrique Bacigalupo, lawyer, Madrid, Spain.
 Mario Costa Barberena, Professor of Vertebrate Paleontology, Institute of Geosciences, Federal University of Rio Grande do Sul.
 Eugenio Bulygin, Professor of Jurisprudence, National University of La Plata; Associate Professor of the Philosophy of Law, University of Buenos Aires, Argentina.
 Samuel Claro-Valdes, deceased. Professor of Musicology, Catholic University of Chile.
 Germán Colmenares, Professor of History, University of Valle, Cali, Colombia.
 Felipe Ehrenberg Enriquez, artist, Mexico, D.F..
 Ezequiel Luis Gallo, research historian, Torcuato Di Tella Institute, Buenos Aires; Senior Researcher, University of Belgrano, Buenos Aires.
 Alberto Juajibioy Chindoy, curator, University Museum, University of Antioquia, Medellin, Colombia.
 Luc-Toni Kuhn Martin, filmmaker, Mexico, D.F., Mexico.
 Ana Maria Martirena-Mantel, Professor of International Economics, University of Buenos Aires; Senior Economist, Center for Economic Research, Torcuato di Tella Institute, Buenos Aires.
 Lorena Mirambell, President, Council of Archaeology; Chairman, Department of Prehistory, National Institute of Anthropology and History, Mexico, D.F., Mexico.
 Jaime Alberto Moguilevsky, Professor of Physiology, University of Buenos Aires Medical School.
 Edgar Negret, sculptor, Bogotá, Colombia.
 Sergio Machado Rezende, Professor of Physics, Federal University of Pernambuco, Recife, Brazil.
 Domingo M. Rivarola, Director, Paraguayan Center for Sociological Studies, Asuncion.
 Catalina A. Rotunno, Director, Department of Biophysics, Albert Einstein Center of Medical Research, Buenos Aires.
 Gustavo Sainz, writer; Professor of Spanish, Indiana University.
 Severo Sarduy, deceased. Fiction.
 Aron Simis, Professor of Mathematics, Federal University of Bahia, Brazil.
 Carlos Bruno Suárez, Career Investigator, National Research Council of Argentina; Assistant Professor of Physics, National University of La Plata.
 Héctor N. Torres, Professor of Molecular Biology, University of Buenos Aires; Director, INGEBI-CONICET; Career Scientist, National Research Council, Argentina.
 Ivany Ferraz Marques Válio, Professor of Plant Physiology, Institute of Biology, State University of Campinas, Brazil.
 José J. Villamil, Professor of Planning, University of Puerto Rico, Río Piedra.

External links
Guggenheim Fellows for 1975

1975
1975 awards